James Lovell (died 1778) was an English sculptor and interior decorator. From an obscure background, he has been taken to be a pupil of Peter Scheemakers and Laurent Delvaux.

Works
Stone chimneypiece at Hagley Hall
Early 1750s, pendant for Wroxton Abbey
1754 North drawing room, Belhus mansion, Essex
1756 Church wall monument to Edward and Henrietta Montagu, in Horton, Northamptonshire Church, for Horace Walpole and possibly to his design 
c.1756 Statue of Caractacus in chains, Radway Grange
Chelmsford Cathedral, monument to Benjamin Mildmay, 1st Earl FitzWalter
c.1758 Church monument to Galfridus Mann at Linton, Kent, design by Richard Bentley
Church tablet monument to James Wolfe at Westerham
Norfolk House, chimneypiece and ceiling trophies (attributed), design by Giovanni Battista Borra

References
Michael McCarthy, James Lovell and His Sculptures at Stowe, The Burlington Magazine Vol. 115, No. 841 (Apr., 1973), pp. 220–232. Published by: The Burlington Magazine Publications Ltd. Stable URL: https://www.jstor.org/stable/877332

Notes

External links
Hagley Hall, chimney piece by James Lovell

Year of birth missing
1778 deaths
English sculptors
English male sculptors